The Democratic List was a political party in Luxembourg.

History
The party was established by former members of the Liberal League and Party of the Right. It was linked to the Free List of Farmers, the Middle Class and Workers, with Pierre Prüm included on the list of both parties. It received 9.8% of the vote in the  1937 elections, winning two seats. It did not contest any further elections.

References

Defunct political parties in Luxembourg
Political parties with year of establishment missing
Political parties with year of disestablishment missing